Rūpa means "form". As it relates to any kind of basic object, it has more specific meanings in the context of Indic religions.

Definition
According to the Monier-Williams Dictionary (2006), rūpa is defined as:
 ... any outward appearance or phenomenon or colour (often pl.), form, shape, figure RV. &c &c ... 
 to assume a form ; often ifc. = " having the form or appearance or colour of ", " formed or composed of ", " consisting of ", " like to " ....

Hinduism
In Hinduism, many compound words are made using rūpa  to describe subtle and spiritual realities such as the svarupa, meaning the form of the self.  It may be used to express matter or material phenomena, especially that linked to the power of vision in samkhya, In the Bhagavad Gita, the Vishvarupa form, an esoteric conception of the Absolute is described.

Buddhism

Overall, rūpa is the Buddhist  concept of material form, including both the body and external matter.

More specifically, in the Pali Canon, rūpa is contextualized in three significant frameworks:
 rūpa-khandha – "material forms," one of the five aggregates (khandha) by which all phenomena can be categorized (see Fig. 1).
 rūpa-āyatana – "visible objects," the external sense objects of the eye, one of the six external sense bases (āyatana) by which the world is known (see Fig. 2).
 nāma-rūpa – "name and form" or "mind and body," which in the causal chain of dependent origination (paticca-samuppāda) arises from consciousness and leads to the arising of the sense bases.

In addition, more generally, rūpa is used to describe a statue, in which it is sometimes called Buddharupa.

In Buddhism, Rūpa is one of Skandha, it perceived by colors and images.

Rūpa-khandha
According to the Yogacara school, rūpa is not matter as in the metaphysical substance of materialism. Instead it means both materiality and sensibility—signifying, for example, a tactile object both insofar as that object is made of matter and that the object can be tactically sensed. In fact rūpa is more essentially defined by its amenability to being sensed than its being matter: just like everything else it is defined in terms of its function; what it does, not what it is. As matter, rūpa is traditionally analysed in two ways: as four primary elements (Pali, mahābhūta); and, as ten or twenty-four secondary or derived elements.

Four primary elements 
Existing rūpa consists in the four primary or underived (no-upādā) elements:   
 earth or solidity   
 fire or heat   
 water or cohesion   
 air or movement

Derived matter
In the Abhidhamma Pitaka and later Pali literature, rūpa is further analyzed in terms of ten or twenty-three or twenty-four types of secondary or derived (upādā) matter. In the list of ten types of secondary matter, the following are identified:
 eye
 ear
 nose
 tongue
 body
 form
 sound
 odour   
 taste
 touch

If twenty-four secondary types are enumerated, then the following fifteen are added to the first nine of the above ten: 
 femininity  
 masculinity or virility   
 life or vitality
 heart or heart-basis
 physical indications (movements that indicate intentions)   
 vocal indications   
 space element   
 physical lightness or buoyancy   
 physical yieldingness or plasticity
 physical handiness or wieldiness
 physical grouping or integration
 physical extension or maintenance
 physical aging or decay
 physical impermanence   
 food

A list of 23 derived types can be found, for instance, in the Abhidhamma Pitaka's Dhammasangani (e.g., Dhs. 596), which omits the list of 24 derived types' "heart-basis."

The rupa jhānas

See also 
   
 Abhidharma
 Body
 Consciousness 
 Perceptions
 Sensations
 Buddharupa   
 Buddhism and the body
 Consciousness (Buddhism)  
 Namarupa (concept)  
 Skandhas
 Sankhata
 Sanna
 Vedana
 Vijnana
 Substantial form
 Three marks of existence

Notes

References

Sources

 

 
 
 Buddhaghosa, Bhadantācariya (trans. from Pāli by Bhikkhu Ñāamoli) (1999). The Path of Purification: Visuddhimagga. Seattle, WA: BPS Pariyatti Editions. .

 

 

 

 Hamilton, Sue (2001). Identity and Experience: The Constitution of the Human Being according to Early Buddhism. Oxford: Luzac Oriental. 

 

 

 

 
 Monier-Williams, Monier (1899, 1964). A Sanskrit-English Dictionary. London: Oxford University Press.  .  Retrieved 2008-03-06 from "Cologne University" at http://www.sanskrit-lexicon.uni-koeln.de/scans/MWScan/index.php?sfx=pdf

 

 Rhys Davids, Caroline A.F. ([1900], 2003). Buddhist Manual of Psychological Ethics, of the Fourth Century B.C., Being a Translation, now made for the First Time, from the Original Pāli, of the First Book of the Abhidhamma-Piaka, entitled Dhamma- (Compendium of States or Phenomena). Whitefish, MT: Kessinger Publishing.

External links 
 Thanissaro Bhikkhu (trans.) (2003). Maha-hatthipadopama Sutta: The Great Elephant Footprint Simile (MN 28).

Hindu philosophical concepts
Buddhist philosophical concepts
Physical objects
Sanskrit words and phrases